Annie Davies (16 June 1910 – 7 May 1970) was a Welsh radio and television producer. Her parents were David and Elizabeth Davies, who lived in the Tregaron area. She attended schools in Castell Fflemish and Tregaron, before studying for a degree at U.C.W. Aberystwyth, from which she graduated in History and Latin in 1933.

She first joined the staff of the BBC in 1935 (as secretary to Sam Jones), leaving her position with Cardiff City Library. In 1946 she left the BBC and took up a position with Urdd Gobaith Cymru, where she remained until returning to BBC Bangor as producer of Radio Talks in 1949, before moving to the BBC's Cardiff headquarters in 1955. There she worked as programme editor for the literary radio programme Llafar, produced (and later edited) the television programme Heddiw (the first television programme to discuss national and international matters in Welsh), and was responsible for the production of programmes such as Shepherd's Calendar, Nant Dialedd, Prynhawn o Fai, and Bugail Cwm Prysor.

She continued to work for the BBC until her retirement in 1969, when she returned to Tregaron.

Personal life 
In May 1970, Davies died in Singleton Hospital, Swansea. She was buried in the graveyard of Bwlchgwynt chapel, Tregaron.

References 

20th-century Welsh historians
1910 births
1970 deaths
Welsh radio personalities
Welsh television producers
British women television producers
20th-century British businesspeople